The 1956–57 Boston Bruins were one of six teams in the 40th season of the National Hockey League. The team finished with a record of 34 wins, 24 losses, and 12 ties. Their record earned them the third seed in the Stanley Cup playoffs, where they lost to the Montreal Canadiens in the final. With 21 goals and 39 assists, Center Don McKenney was the team's leading scorer.

Offseason

Regular season

Final standings

Record vs. opponents

Schedule and results

Playoffs
 See 1957 Stanley Cup Finals.

The Boston Bruins were seeded third in the Stanley Cup Semi-finals, where they defeated the top seeded Detroit Red Wings 4–1. In the Stanley Cup Finals, the Bruins were defeated by the Montreal Canadiens 4–1.

Player statistics

Regular season
Scoring

Goaltending

Playoffs
Scoring

Goaltending

Awards and records
26-year-old RW Larry Regan was awarded the Calder Memorial Trophy as the Rookie of the Year.

Transactions

Farm teams
 Hershey Bears
 Victoria Cougars
 Quebec Aces

See also
1956–57 NHL season

References

External links

Boston Bruins seasons
Boston Bruins
Boston Bruins
Boston Bruins
Boston Bruins
1950s in Boston